The Men's Super-G B1 was one of the events held in Alpine skiing at the 1992 Winter Paralympics in Tignes and Albertville, France.

There were 4 competitors in the final.

Bruno Kuehne won his only Paralympic medal at this event.

Results

Final

References 

Super-G